Oko, also known as Ocô in Brazil, was an Orisha. In Nigeria and the Benin Republic, he was a strong hunter & farming deity as well as a fighter against sorcery. He was associated with the annual new harvest of the white African yam. Among the deities, he was considered as a close friend of Oosa Ogiyan and Shango, as well as a one time husband of Oya and Yemoja. Bees are considered the messengers of Oko.

In Brazilian Candomblé, he represents one of the Orisha of agriculture, together with Ogum. According to Prandi, Oko songs and myths are remembered, but the presence in celebrations is rare. In his representation, he had a wooden staff, plays a flute of bones and wears white.

Oko is syncretized with Saint Isidore among Cuban orisha practitioners of Santería (Lucumí) and Regla de Ocha.

Notes

References
 
 
 
 
 
 
 
 
 

Yoruba deities
Agricultural gods
Yoruba mythology
Santería
Fertility gods
Hunting gods